Schoenflies (or Schönflies) displacement (or motion) named after Arthur Moritz Schoenflies is a rigid body motion consisting of linear motion in three dimensional space plus one orientation around an axis with fixed direction.  In robotic manipulation this is a common motion as many pick and place operations require moving an object from one plane and placing it with a different orientation onto another parallel plane (e.g., placement of components on a circuit board). These robots are commonly called Schoenflies-motion generators.

Because the SCARA manipulator was one of the first manipulators providing similar motion, this is often referred to as SCARA-type motion.  Today, many robotic manipulators, including some with parallel kinematic architecture, are used in industry for applications ranging from the manufacture of electronics to food processing and packaging industry.

See also
 Articulated robot
 Parallel manipulator
 SCARA
 Delta robot

References 

Industrial robots
Robot kinematics
Robotic manipulation